The House That Dripped Blood is a 1971 British anthology horror film directed by Peter Duffell and distributed by Amicus Productions. It stars Christopher Lee, Peter Cushing, Nyree Dawn Porter, Denholm Elliott, and Jon Pertwee. The film is a collection of four short stories concerning a series of inhabitants of the eponymous building. All of the stories were originally written, and subsequently scripted, by Robert Bloch.

Plot

Framework part 1

Shortly after renting an old country house, film star Paul Henderson mysteriously disappears and Inspector Holloway (John Bennett) from Scotland Yard is called to investigate. Inquiring at the local police station, Holloway is told some of the house's history.

Method for Murder (Fury #7, July 1962) 

Charles Hillyer (Denholm Elliott), a hack writer who specialises in horror stories, and his wife Alice (Joanna Dunham), move into the house. Charles begins working on a novel focusing on Dominic, a murderous, psychopathic strangler; Charles becomes simultaneously enamoured and disturbed by the character. Charles soon starts to see Dominic (Tom Adams), who begins stalking and tormenting him.

Charles begins seeing a psychologist, Dr. Andrews (Robert Lang), who suggests Dominic is a split personality formed by him getting into Dominic's mindset to write the novel. Charles's visions of Dominic become even more pronounced. He sees Dominic strangling Alice, only for her to claim that Charles had been strangling her. At another session with Dr. Andrews, Andrews suggests Dominic is the result of darker sides of Charles’ personality being released by writing the novel, though Charles is sceptical. Suddenly, Dominic arrives and strangles Dr. Andrews while Charles watches in horror.

At the house, Dominic approaches Alice, only to reveal that he is actually Richard, her lover. Richard, an actor, had been pretending to be Dominic to drive Charles insane, so that Alice and Richard could take the money made from his novel and run off together. Alice gets a call from the police, and learns that both Dr. Andrews and Charles had been strangled to death. Alice asks Richard why he had killed them, as it was not part of the plan, only for Richard to reveal he now believes he is Dominic. Richard/Dominic then strangles Alice while laughing maniacally.

Framework part 2

Sergeant Martin informs Holloway that Richard/Dominic was later found standing over Alice's body, laughing. He says he believes that it was not merely a case of Richard/Dominic being driven to madness by the role, but some effect of the house itself. Holloway dismisses this as absurd, so Martin tells him another story, of the next tenant to inhabit the house.

Waxworks (Weird Tales Vol. 33 #1, January 1939) 

Retired stockbroker Philip Grayson (Peter Cushing) moves into the house. Though initially he occupies himself with his hobbies, he quickly becomes lonely. One day, while wandering around town, he happens upon a wax museum. Grayson explores the museum and finds a sculpture of Salome which resembles a dead woman he had been in love with. The museum's proprietor (Wolfe Morris) explains that he based the likeness of the sculpture after his late wife, who had been executed after murdering his best friend. Disturbed, Grayson vows never to return.

His friend, Neville Rogers (Joss Ackland) arrives at his home while travelling on business. Grayson eagerly invites him to stay the night, and it becomes clear the two had both been romantic rivals for the same woman; however, the two had reconciled after her death. The next day, Grayson takes Neville around town, and the two spot the wax museum. Though Grayson tries to persuade him not to, Neville enters the wax museum and spots the sculpture, becoming obsessed with it. Neville tries to leave town, but is unable to abandon the sculpture. Staying at a local motel, he calls Grayson and informs him of his predicament. When Grayson arrives, he finds Neville has left for the wax museum. Grayson goes to the museum, and finds Neville's severed head has been added to an exhibit. The proprietor arrives and reveals he had framed his wife for his friend's murder, so that he could cover her corpse in wax and keep her to himself forever. However, men continue to become enamoured with her, and some, like Neville, become obsessed, which puts him into a murderous rage. The proprietor then murders Grayson with an axe, and adds his head to the Salome exhibit.

Framework part 3

Holloway asks if Henderson moved in next, and is told that there was one other tenant before him. However, Holloway does not stay around to hear this story, believing the whole thing preposterous, and instead decides to confer with the estate agent, A.J. Stoker (John Bryans). Stoker tells Holloway that he "tried to warn them" of the house's "secret", and asks Holloway if he has "guessed it yet". Holloway ignores this, dismissing this too as absurd, and instead asks him what happened to the tenant before Henderson. Stoker explains.

Sweets to the Sweet (Weird Tales Vol. 39 #10, March 1947) 

Widower John Reid (Christopher Lee) moves into the house along with his pyrophobic young daughter Jane (Chloe Franks). John hires former teacher Ann Norton (Nyree Dawn Porter) to tutor Jane. Ann gradually bonds with Jane, and she helps Jane get over her fear of fire and teaches her how to read, but begins to suspect John is abusive: he does not allow her to play with other children or own toys, and does his best to keep her isolated.

Norton confronts John about his parenting, and asks if he blames Jane for the death of his wife, to which John responds that he is glad his wife is dead. Norton manages to get John to allow her to buy Jane some toys; when John discovers a doll amongst the toys bought, he snatches it from Jane and tosses it in the fire. Jane begins to secretly read books about witchcraft. One night, during a blackout, John discovers some of the candles are missing. John angrily questions Jane about this and slaps her, to Ann's horror. Jane secretly uses the missing candles to form a wax voodoo doll, which she uses to leave John bedridden.

He reveals to Ann that Jane's mother was a witch, and that Jane is as well; the reason for his parenting methods were to stop Jane from harming anybody. When Jane begins to attack John via the doll once again, he instructs Ann to find the doll and take it from Jane to stop her from killing him. Ann finds Jane standing next to the burning fireplace holding the doll; Ann tries to convince her to give her the doll, but Jane tosses the doll into the fire. Ann listens in horror as John burns to death and Jane smiles evilly.

Framework part 4

Holloway dismisses this story as the most ridiculous so far, and demands the realtor tell him about Henderson. Stoker clarifies that he warned Henderson not take it, not believing it would be "right for his personality", but states that he gave in once Henderson insisted. He then tells his final story.

The Cloak (Unknown May 1939) 

Temperamental veteran horror film actor Paul Henderson (Jon Pertwee) moves into the house while starring in a vampire film being shot nearby. Henderson, a great fan of the horror genre, is angry over the lack of realism in the film, particularly over the cloak worn by his character (who happens to be a vampire). He decides to purchase a more accurate cloak, and to that end stops at an antique shop run by the enigmatic Theo von Hartmann (Geoffrey Bayldon). Von Hartmann offers him a black cloak after listening to Henderson's demands, and Henderson purchases it. Before he leaves, von Hartmann tells him to use the cloak for its intended purpose.

While in his makeup room, Henderson finds that when he wears the cloak, he has no reflection. Later that day, while shooting a scene where he sucks the blood from his costar and girlfriend Carla (Ingrid Pitt), Paul begins genuinely trying to suck her blood even after the scene ends. A horrified Carla demands he stay away from her. At midnight, the witching hour, Paul puts on the cloak again as a test. He grows fangs and begins to fly, much to his horror.

Paul reads in the newspaper that von Hartmann's shop has burned down and von Hartmann's corpse has been found inside; the corpse was identified as being several hundred years old. Paul realises that von Hartmann was a vampire, and that he gave Henderson the cloak so that he could pass his powers on to Henderson, allowing him to die. Henderson apologizes to Carla and invites her over to his home; he explains to her his predicament, but she is skeptical and demands he prove it by putting on the cloak. Henderson is reluctant, as it is midnight, but he ultimately complies. Paul is relieved to find that nothing happens, but he quickly realises that the cloak had been swapped out for a prop. Carla dons the cloak and reveals she is actually a vampire sent to turn Henderson into another vampire, as most vampires admire his portrayal of their kind. Carla flies towards a screaming Henderson and begins to turn him into a vampire.

Framework part 5

Holloway refuses to believe Stoker and goes to the house, despite it being nearly midnight and the house having no electricity.  He explores the house by candlelight, eventually breaking into a locked basement where he finds and kills Henderson, now a fully transformed vampire. He is himself then killed by Carla.

The next morning Stoker walks up to the house and breaks the fourth wall by talking to the audience — asking if they understand the secret of the house: That it reflects the personality of whoever is living in it and treats them accordingly.  He muses that perhaps the audience would be suitable, and "that there is nothing to fear, provided [they're] the right sort of person".

Cast (by segment)

"Framework"
John Bennett as Detective Inspector Holloway
John Bryans as A.J. Stoker
John Malcolm as Sergeant Martin

"Method For Murder"
Denholm Elliott as Charles Hillyer
Joanna Dunham as Alice Hillyer
Tom Adams as Richard/Dominic
Robert Lang as Dr. Andrews

"Waxworks"
Peter Cushing as Philip Grayson
Joss Ackland as Neville Rogers
Wolfe Morris as Waxworks Proprietor

"Sweets to the Sweet"
Christopher Lee as John Reid
Nyree Dawn Porter as Ann Norton
Chloe Franks as Jane Reid
Hugh Manning as Mark
Carleton Hobbs as Dr. Bailey

"The Cloak"
Jon Pertwee as Paul Henderson
Ingrid Pitt as Carla Lynde
Geoffrey Bayldon as Theo von Hartmann
Jonathan Lynn as Mr. Petrich

Production

Freddie Francis was wanted for the director's chair but he had prior commitments to a film in Hollywood, California that ultimately fell through.

Originally, director Peter Duffell wanted to have the title Death and the Maiden as he used Franz Schubert's composition of the same title in the film. Producer Milton Subotsky insisted on The House That Dripped Blood, telling Duffell "We're in the marketplace, we have to use that title". Not one drop of blood appears in the actual film.

When Peter Duffell was engaged the participation of actors Lee, Cushing and Pitt had already been decided by the producers. All other actors were cast by Duffell.

Jon Pertwee later claimed that the film was "meant to be a comedy-horror film and was initially filmed in that way. According to Pertwee during the production "the producer came in, took one look at what we are doing and went raving mad" insisting it was to be a horror film and not a comedy. This meant a change of tone, but the material which had already been filmed remained, resulting in the film dipping in quality and edits to remove comedy elements from Pertwee's sequences. Pertwee also admitted that he intentionally based his character, the horror actor Paul Henderson, on his co-star and friend Christopher Lee. During the production Lee realised that Pertwee was basing his performance on an actor, but did not know it was based on him. A scene where Jon's character talks about favourite roles, he says that he prefers Bela Lugosi's Dracula rather than the chap who plays him nowadays (meaning Christopher Lee in the Hammer Films genre).

Release

Critical reception
Roger Greenspun of The New York Times wrote in a mixed review that he was "of several minds" about the film, calling the first two stories "as dull in development as they are in idea. But the latter two stories, though necessarily too short and too schematic, generate some interest, and humor, and even a bit of characterization." Variety called it "one of the most entertaining of its genre to come along in several years and should prove strong opposition to the general monopoly of that market by Hammer Films ... even for filmgoers who don't usually follow the shocker market, this one is worthwhile." Kevin Thomas of The Los Angeles Times wrote, "Richly atmospheric settings, muted color photography, an outstanding cast and competent direction (by Peter Duffell) do justice to Bloch's fine script, which deals with psychological terror rather than relying on the typical blood-and-guts formula." Tom Milne of The Monthly Film Bulletin called the first two stories "enjoyable enough in a rough-and-ready way" and the fourth story "a pleasant joke which would have been much funnier had it been played by a genuine horror star such as Vincent Price," but singled out the third story as "in an altogether different league ... it is mainly a mood piece which brilliantly orchestrates the child's loneliness, the father's hapless cruelty, and the governess' well-meaning failure to understand, into a haunting picture of the evil that can come of good intentions."

Among more recent reviews, Allmovie's review of the film was mostly positive, calling it "a solid example of the Amicus horror anthology." Halliwell's Film Guide described the film as "neatly made and generally pleasing despite a low level of originality in the writing." Time Out called the stories "rough-and-ready but vigorous Grand Guignol fun."

Box office
The film was a minor success in the UK but did very well in the US.

Home media

References

Sources

External links
 
 
 

1971 films
1970s fantasy films
1970s English-language films
1971 horror films
British anthology films
British comedy horror films
1970s comedy horror films
British haunted house films
British supernatural horror films
Amicus Productions films
Films set in country houses
British horror anthology films
Horror anthologies
Patricide in fiction
Films about dissociative identity disorder
British vampire films
Films about witchcraft
Films based on works by Robert Bloch
Films with screenplays by Robert Bloch
1971 comedy films
Fantasy anthology films
Films based on short fiction
Films directed by Peter Duffell
1970s British films